Lukas Markovic (born 5 January 1987) is an Australian rules footballer who currently plays for the Footscray Bulldogs of the VFL.

Originally selected pick 19 in the 2006 Rookie Draft by Hawthorn, Markovic spent 2 years on the club's list, his 2007 season was curtailed by a broken ankle, before being delisted at the end of 2008 without playing any games.

Markovic was co-captain of Hawthorn's VFL affiliate, The Box Hill Hawks in 2009.

He was then drafted in the 2009 Draft at pick 63 to the Bulldogs, where he was on the senior list until being delisted at the end of 2013.

On 7 February 2014, Markovic and Nick Lower were named the inaugural captains of the newly established VFL club, the Footscray Bulldogs.

References

External links 

1987 births
Living people
Western Bulldogs players
Box Hill Football Club players
Williamstown Football Club players
Australian rules footballers from Victoria (Australia)